Terry John Care was a Democratic member of the Nevada Senate, representing Clark Country District 7 (map) from 1998 through 2010.

External links
Nevada State Legislature - Senator Terry John Care official government website
Project Vote Smart - Senator Terry John Care (NV) profile
Follow the Money - Terry John Care
2006 2004 2002 2000 1998 campaign contributions

1947 births
Living people
Journalists from Las Vegas
Democratic Party Nevada state senators